The 2018 Swedish Golf Tour was the 33rd season of the Swedish Golf Tour, a series of professional golf tournaments for women held in Sweden and Norway.

A number of the tournaments also featured on the 2018 LET Access Series (LETAS).

Schedule
The season consisted of 13 tournaments played between May and September, where two events were held in Norway.

See also
2018 Swedish Golf Tour (men's tour)

References

External links
Official homepage of the Swedish Golf Tour

Swedish Golf Tour (women)
Swedish Golf Tour (women)